A jinni or genie is a spirit mentioned in Islamic theology.

Jinni may also refer to:

People
 Choi Yun-jin, former member of K-Pop group Nmixx under the stage name Jinni
 Jinni Featherstone-Witty, member of the winning 2000 Roehampton Trophy polo team
 Jinni Mondejar, volleyball player for San Sebastian Stags

Other uses
 Jinni (search engine), a former search and recommendation engine
 Jinni (film), a 2010 Maldivian horror film
 Jinni, a 2000 album by DMBQ

See also
 Umm Jinni, one of the Hawar Islands of Bahrain
 Jini, network architecture for the construction of distributed systems
 Jinny (disambiguation)
 Jinn (disambiguation)
 Djinn (disambiguation)